The 1916 Cal Poly Mustangs football team represented California Polytechnic School, now California Polytechnic State University, in the 1916 college football season. Led by second-year head coach D. W. Schlosser, Cal Poly compiled a record of 1–2 and were outscored by their opponents 56 to 25.

Cal Poly was a two-year school until 1941.

Schedule

References

Cal Poly
Cal Poly Mustangs football seasons
Cal Poly Mustangs football